Rage of the Gladiator is a WiiWare, 3DS, iOS, and Android game. It is the second WiiWare game to use the Wii MotionPlus. The gameplay is similar to the gameplay of Punch-Out.

In 2017, it has been reported that the Android version was removed from the Google Play Store for unknown reasons.

Plot
The game begins in the arena, but the story is told in cut scenes after boss battles. Gracius (the player) is the twin son of the King of Avalance, Marius making him a prince. Avalance is a Greco-Roman style City State, teeming with mythical creatures. The King took Gracius's mother, Maia, as a bride by defeating the nearby city of Angalore. Gracius was born minutes before his twin brother, Luthor. Maia died in child birth, but prayed to the gods for her sons to be blessed with great strength and valor. A week prior to the start of the game Gracius and Luthor were made aware of their father's death. King Marius had been killed in his sleep, and witnesses claimed Gracius was the murderer. Gracius's own soldiers handcuffed him and took him away. Luthor told them to stop, but was restrained and ignored.

It is eventually revealed that Luthor had framed Gracius to take the throne for himself, and Gracius bitterly accepts his own naive nature at not seeing the truth.

Overview
Rage of the Gladiator is a fantasy-based first-person perspective fighting game. You play the role of Gracius, battling for his life in the arena.

According to an interview with Joystiq, Ghostfire Games CEO Ed Roman states "The game consists entirely of boss fights. After all, boss fights are the most interesting aspects of most video games. So we skipped the "fodder" creatures. Each boss is essentially a little "puzzle" that you need to figure out how to defeat. Some require dexterity, others require memorization, and some require listening to what they're saying very carefully so that you react to their attacks appropriately."

In the same interview, Ed Roman cited a little-known 1990 Neo Geo game Crossed Swords as inspiration for the first-person fighting concept, in addition to influences from several popular games, such as the combat system in Punch-Out!!, the combo system in God of War, the cutscenes in Final Fantasy, and the tech trees in Diablo or World of Warcraft, as well as the background music in films such as 300.

Gameplay
To win, the player must wait for the right moment, then dodge, jump, or block the enemy’s attacks. After avoiding an attack, the player may retaliate. Additionally, the player may  counter-attack while the enemy is performing an attack. Once you learn to exploit the weakness of each enemy with the proper timing and agility, you can use this knowledge to defeat them.

In the Wii version, once you’ve beaten the first 10 opponents in "Normal Mode", you must face them all again in "Challenge Mode". In this mode, the opponent gain new powers and are much more difficult. The final opponent is only unlocked at the end of Challenge Mode. This results in a total of 21 battles in the game.

In the iOS and Android versions, the same opponents are used, but the player must fight each of them three times, and Lord Vensor III, the penultimate unique opponent, is faced after fighting the first two variations of the previous opponents. A star system is used to control when players are allowed to fight the next few opponents, and stars are earned from winning standard matches, as well as two challenge matches for each opponent where the player must fulfill (a) certain condition(s) to win, such as a time limit and/or performing a certain number of counterattacks. This version features a new armory where players can customize their weapons and armor, which feature stronger gear sets that must be purchased with "gems", a premium currency that is accrued mostly through in-app purchases. One notable difference in the plot is that Prince Luther manages to escape capture after the final fight and Gracius is haunted by his "betrayal", unlike in the WiiWare version, where he was caught.

In all versions, after each fight, the player is able to upgrade their abilities before moving on to the next opponent, using a Skill tree. Completely filling the skill tree in the WiiWare version will unlock the Brutal Victory move, which can be used to instantly knock out opponents for one round if the player's mana gauge is full and has an open opportunity to attack. The Brutal Victory skill is unlocked in the mobile versions by starting up the game at a certain time of day for four sets of five consecutive days.

Skill Tree
The player is awarded "skill points" after each victory, which they can use to upgrade their character in one of three ways.

Offense: Focuses on hitting harder, gaining critical strikes, leeching health from opponents, and conjuring spells.

Defense: Focuses on taking less damage, improved blocking, the ability to heal yourself in combat, and the ability to resurrect from death.

Magic: Focuses on generating more energy to perform combos, channeling electricity into opponents, and summoning spells like lightning and tornados.

Media
According to Cheat Code Central's Jonathan Marx, "Rage of the Gladiator looks like it's shaping up to be a premium title for WiiWare.", and "Ghostfire Games is set to deliver an engaging gaming experience later this year".

In an interview with GameZone, Michael Lafferty states "The games streaming in as downloads are getting better and better and Ghostfire Games has a real treat in store for Wii fans. Rage of the Gladiator is poised to be a benchmark game."

Reception
IGN.com scored the game an 8.5/10 and had the following to say: "The production values on display here are impressive, especially for a WiiWare game. Multiple control schemes offer something for both fans of old school and motion controls, the game looks great, and lots of voice acting brings these bosses to life."

NintendoLife.com gave the game a 9/10, stating: "Rage of the Gladiator is the kind of WiiWare game we'd like to see more often, with excellent control, great design and bags of fun."

GameZone's Dan Liebman gave the game an 8 out of 10, saying "Ghostfire Games offers a new twist on the classic boxing simulator with Rage of the Gladiator. The mechanics are fairly familiar, and easy to grasp even if you’re a newcomer. Using the first-person perspective, the player is thrust into the sandals of Gracius, a comically melodramatic aristocrat-turned-brawler who must face a slew of bizarre enemies in the arena." and "With an emphasis on feel-good playability, it’s hard to go wrong with Rage of the Gladiator. Any old school boxing gamer will feel right at home."

References

External links
Official iOS/Android site
Official Wii site
IGN review

2010 video games
Fantasy video games
Fighting games
Video games developed in the United States
WiiWare games
Wii MotionPlus games
Wii games
IOS games
Android (operating system) games
Nintendo 3DS eShop games
Video games about gladiatorial combat
Single-player video games